Roger Boyle, 2nd Earl of Orrery (24 August 1646 - 29 March 1682), styled Lord Broghill between 1660 and 1679, was an Irish peer and Member of Parliament.

Boyle was born in Dublin, the son of Roger Boyle, 1st Earl of Orrery, by Lady Margaret, daughter of Theophilus Howard, 2nd Earl of Suffolk. He was educated at Trinity College, Dublin. In 1665 he was returned to the Irish House of Commons for County Cork, a seat he held until the following year. In 1679 he succeeded his father in the earldom and entered the Irish House of Lords.

Lord Orrery married Mary, daughter of Richard Sackville, 5th Earl of Dorset, in 1665. He died in March 1682, aged 35, and was succeeded in the earldom by his eldest son, Lionel. The Countess of Orrery died in London in November 1710, aged 62.

References

Further reading
 

1646 births
1682 deaths
Alumni of Trinity College Dublin
Roger
Nobility from Dublin (city)
Earls of Orrery
Members of the Parliament of Ireland (pre-1801) for County Cork constituencies
Politicians from Dublin (city)
2nd